Augusto Arenas (15 March 1929 – 24 March 2015) was a Chilean footballer. He played in one match for the Chile national football team in 1953. He was also part of Chile's squad for the 1953 South American Championship.

References

External links
 

1929 births
2015 deaths
Chilean footballers
Chile international footballers
Association football midfielders
Everton de Viña del Mar footballers
O'Higgins F.C. footballers